Pink: Live in Europe (subtitled From the 2004 Try This Tour) is the first live music DVD from Pink, released in 2006. It was shot in Manchester, England during the European leg of the 2004 Try This Tour. The setlist more or less was in chronological order (with a few obvious exceptions including "Get the Party Started"). Most of the singles were represented, with the exception of "You Make Me Sick" and several album-only cuts were prominently featured. It is also notable that several songs that appear as collaborations on albums (such "Lady Marmalade" which originally featured Christina Aguilera, Lil' Kim, and Mýa or "Misery," a duet with Steven Tyler) were not featured as such on tour, with Pink either taking over vocals for the previous partners or omitting those segments entirely. It was released MA: Strong Sexual References.

Overview
During the performance of "Lady Marmalade", Pink imitated Christina Aguilera and sang lines from Aguilera's song "Beautiful". For the DVD release, this segment was branded with a "CENSORED" mark and the audio was modulated so the viewer could not decipher the lyrics.
The song also has many sexual references  and gave the DVD a 15 Age Rating in Ireland.   
          
A number of covers are featured on DVD including an entire segment dedicated to Janis Joplin, wherein Pink sang select pieces of 3 songs. Pink, a longtime Joplin fan, was at one point considered for a biopic of the troubled musician.

The concert became the 6th highest-selling DVD for 2007 in Australia.

Track listing
 "Can't Take Me Home"
 "There You Go"
 "Split Personality"
 "Most Girls"
 "Lady Marmalade"
  "I Wanna Rock"
 "Don't Let Me Get Me"
 "18 Wheeler"
 "Family Portrait"
 "Just like a Pill"
 "Respect"
 "My Vietnam"
 "Misery"
 "Eventually"
 "Summertime"/"Me and Bobby McGee"/"Piece of My Heart" 
 "Feel Good Time"
 "God Is a DJ"
 "Oh My God"
 "Trouble"
 "Last to Know"
 "Try Too Hard"
 "Unwind"
 "Welcome to the Jungle" 
 "Get the Party Started"

Charts and certifications
Chart positions

Certifications

Notes

Pink (singer) video albums